Yevgeny Borisovich Komarov (born on 10 April 1942), is a Russian statesman and political party manager. He served as the 1st Governor (Head) of the Murmansk Oblast from 1991 to 1996.

Biography

Yevgeny Komarov was born in a small village of Bolshoye Kuznechkovo on 10 April 1942.

In 1961, he graduated from the Rzhevskoe Railway School, after which he got a job as a foreman for repairing the track at the station of the Kolsky District of the Murmansk Oblast. He went to the Soviet army by conscription in the same year, serving in the Murmansk Oblast.

From 1964, he worked as an electrician at the Pechenganikel Mining and Metallurgical Combine. A year later, in 1965, he entered the CPSU.

From 1972, he began his employment on the party work in Pechenga, and then in the Kovdorsky District Committee of the CPSU.

In 1982, Komarov became chairman of the executive committee of the Kovdorsky District Council of People's Deputies, and in 1984 the first secretary of the Kovdorsky District Committee of the CPSU. In 1985, he graduated from the Leningrad Financial and Economic Institute. And in 1988, he became secretary and member of the bureau of the regional party committee.

On 11 October 1990, by a resolution of the Supreme Soviet of the RSFSR, Yevgeny Komarov was approved by the chairman of the RSFSR State Committee on the Social and Economic Development of the North.

Governor of Murmansk Oblast

By decree of the President of the RSFSR of November 7, 1991, Yevgeny Komarov, at the age of 49, was appointed head of the administration of the Murmansk Oblast, by Boris Yeltsin. He took office on November 10, 1991. In December 1996, he lost the election to Yury Yevdokimov (in the first round, he won first place among 8 candidates (31% of the vote), in the second round he received 40.64%, giving Evdokimov less than 3%).
In 2000, he ran for governor against Yedokimov again, but unsuccessfully lost the election once again, gaining only 3.37% of the vote.

References

1942 births
Living people
People from Kuvshinovsky District
Communist Party of the Soviet Union members
Members of the Federation Council of Russia (1996–2000)
Governors of Murmansk Oblast
Electricians
Soviet Army personnel